In Greek mythology, Halimede or Alimede (Ancient Greek: Ἁλιμήδη Halimêdê) was the "rich-crowned" Nereid, sea-nymph daughter of the 'Old Man of the Sea' Nereus and the Oceanid Doris. Her name means 'the sea-goddess of good counsel'.

Notes

References 

 Apollodorus, The Library with an English Translation by Sir James George Frazer, F.B.A., F.R.S. in 2 Volumes, Cambridge, MA, Harvard University Press; London, William Heinemann Ltd. 1921. . Online version at the Perseus Digital Library. Greek text available from the same website.
 Hesiod, Theogony from The Homeric Hymns and Homerica with an English Translation by Hugh G. Evelyn-White, Cambridge, MA.,Harvard University Press; London, William Heinemann Ltd. 1914. Online version at the Perseus Digital Library. Greek text available from the same website.
 Kerényi, Carl, The Gods of the Greeks, Thames and Hudson, London, 1951.

Nereids